Music for a French Elevator and Other Short Format Oddities by The Books (often referred to as simply Music for a French Elevator) is a 2006 release by The Books. It is a compendium on mini CD of four pieces created for the "1%" art and sound installation in the Ministry of Culture in Paris, France in 2004. The pieces were created to be played in the elevator of the Ministry, giving the release its title. Following the initial four tracks (those designed for the elevator) are "several 'classic' spoken word tracks" taken from The Books' sample libraries.

This release was distributed on tour in 2006 and is available from The Books online store.

The tracks on this limited release are generally very short. The first four tracks (designed for the aforementioned French elevator) feature many samples of French language phrases.

Track listing

References

2006 albums
The Books albums